William Desmond (born William Mannion; January 23, 1878 – November 3, 1949) was an American actor. He appeared in more than 200 films between 1915 and 1948. He was nicknamed "The King of the Silent Serials."

Born William Mannion in Horseheads, New York, he was raised in New York City. He later changed his surname to a stage name. He started out in vaudeville and the legitimate stage before making his film debut. In 1919, he married his co-star Mary McIvor, with whom he had two daughters. 

On November 3, 1949, Desmond died at age 71 of a heart attack in Los Angeles, California. He is interred at the Chapel of the Pines Crematory, Los Angeles.

Selected filmography

 Kilmeny (1915) - Bob Meredith
 The Majesty of the Law (1915) - Jackson Morgan Kent
 Peer Gynt (1915) - The Parson
 Peggy (1916) - Rev. Donald Bruce
 Bullets and Brown Eyes (1916) - Prince Carl
 The Waifs (1916) - Arthur Rayburn
 Not My Sister (1916) - Michael Arnold
 The Sorrows of Love (1916) - Guido Perli
 The Captive God (1916)
 The Payment (1916) - Dick
 Lieutenant Danny, U.S.A. (1916) - Lt. Danny Ward
 The Dawn Maker (1916) - Bruce Smithson
 The Criminal (1916) - Donald White
 A Gamble in Souls (1916) - Arthur Worden, Evangelist
 The Iced Bullet (1917) - The Author / Horace Lee
 The Last of the Ingrams (1917) - Jules Ingram
 Blood Will Tell (1917) - Samson Oakley III
 Paddy O'Hara (1917) - Paddy O'Hara
 Paws of the Bear (1917) - Ray Bourke
 Time Locks and Diamonds (1917) - Silver Jim Farrel
 Master of His Home (1917) - Carson Stewart
 Flying Colors (1917) - Brent Brewster
 Married in Name Only (1917)
 Fighting Back (1917) - The Weakling
 The Sudden Gentleman (1917) - Garry Garrity
 Captain of His Soul (1918) - Horace Boyce
 The Sea Panther (1918) - Paul Le Marsan
 Society for Sale (1918) - Honorable Billy
 An Honest Man (1918) - Benny Boggs
 Old Hartwell's Cub (1918) - Bill Hartwell
 Closin' In (1918) - Jack Bradon
 Hell's End (1918) - Jack Donovan
 Beyond the Shadows (1918) - Jean Du Bois
 Wild Life (1918) - Chick Ward
 The Pretender (1918) - Bob Baldwin
 Deuce Duncan (1918) - Deuce Duncan
 Life's a Funny Proposition (1919) - Jimmie Pendleton
 The Prodigal Liar (1919) - Percival Montgomery Edwards
 Her Code of Honor (1919) - Eugene La Salle
 Whitewashed Walls (1919) - Larry Donovan
 The Mints of Hell (1919) - Dan Burke
 Bare-Fisted Gallagher (1919) - 'Bare-Fisted' Gallagher
  A Sagebrush Hamlet (1919) - Larry Lang
 Dangerous Waters (1919) - Jimmie Moulton
 The Blue Bandanna (1919) - Jerry Jerome
 The Prince and Betty (1919) - John Maude
 A Broadway Cowboy (1920) - Burke Randolph
 Twin Beds (1920) - Harry Hawkins
 The Parish Priest (1920) - Reverend John Whalen
 Women Men Love (1921) - David Hunter
 The Child Thou Gavest Me (1921) - Tom Marshall
 Dangerous Toys (1921) - Jack Gray
 Fightin' Mad (1921) - Bud McGraw
 Don't Leave Your Husband (1921)
 Perils of the Yukon (1922) - Jack Merrill 
 Night Life in Hollywood (1922) - Himself
 Around the World in Eighteen Days (1923) - Phineas Fogg III
 The Phantom Fortune (1923) - Larry Barclay
 McGuire of the Mounted (1923) - Bob McGuire
 Shadows of the North (1923) - Ben 'Wolf' Darby
 Beasts of Paradise (1923) - Phil Grant
 The Extra Girl (1923) - William Desmond - Actor
 The Eagle's Talons (1923)
 The Breathless Moment (1924) - Billy Carson
 Big Timber (1924) - Walter Sandry
The Measure of a Man (1924) - John Fairmeadow
 The Sunset Trail (1924) - Happy Hobo
 The Riddle Rider (1924) - Randolph Parker / The Riddle Rider
 Hello, 'Frisco (1924 short) - Himself - William Desmond
 Outwitted (1925) - Jack Blaisdel
 Ridin' Pretty (1925) - Sky Parker
 Barriers of the Law (1925) - Rex Brandon
 Duped (1925) - John Morgan
 Straight Through (1925) - Good Deed O'Day
 The Burning Trail (1925) - Smiling Bill Flannigan
 Blood and Steel (1925) - Gordon Steele
The Meddler (1925) - Richard Gilmore
 Ace of Spades (1925 serial) - Dan Harvey
 Ace of Spies (1925)
 The Winking Idol (1926) - Dave Ledbetter
 Strings of Steel (1926) - Ned Brown
 Tongues of Scandal (1927) - Gov. John Rhodes
 The Return of the Riddle Rider (1927) - Randolph Parker / The Riddle Rider
 Red Clay (1927) - Chief John Nisheto
 The Vanishing Rider (1928) - Jim Davis / The Vanishing Rider
 The Devil's Trademark (1928) - Morgan Gray
 The Mystery Rider (1928) - Winthrop Lane / The Mystery Rider
 No Defense (1929) - John Harper
 The Phantom of the West (1931) - Martin Blair
 The Vanishing Legion (1931) - Milesburg Sheriff
 First Aid (1931) - Chief of Police
 Hell-Bent for Frisco (1931) - The Editor
 Oklahoma Jim (1931) - Lacy
 The Lightning Warrior (1931 serial) - Townsman (uncredited)
 Battling with Buffalo Bill (1931) - John Mills
 Heroes of the West (1932) - John Blaine
 The Last Frontier (1932 serial) - General Custer (Ch. 1)
 Jungle Mystery (1932) - John Morgan
 A Scarlet Week-End (1932)
 Clancy of the Mounted (1933) - Dave Moran
 Rustlers' Roundup (1933) - San Dimas Sheriff Holden
 The Three Musketeers (1933 serial) - Captain Boncour
 The Whispering Shadow (1933 serial) - Empire Transport Co. driver (uncredited)
 The Phantom of the Air (1933 serial) - Thomas Edmonds
 Laughing at Life (1933) - Military Cabinet Officer
 Gordon of Ghost City (1933 serial) - John Mulford
 Strawberry Roan (1933) - Colonel Brownlee
 The Perils of Pauline (1933 serial) - Prof. Thompson [Chs. 9-12]
 Fargo Express (1933) - Sheriff Joe Thompson
 Pirate Treasure (1934) - Capt. Jim Carson
 Border Guns (1934) - Dr. Jim Wilson
 The Vanishing Shadow (1934 serial) - Newspaper Editor MacDonald
 I Can't Escape (1934) - Parole Officer Donovan
 The Red Rider (1934 serial) - Sheriff Campbell
 The Way of the West (1934) - 'Cash' Horton
 Tailspin Tommy (1934 serial) - Sloane - Taggart's Office Henchman, Chs. 4, 7, 10-11
 Frontier Days (1934) - Sheriff Barnes
 Gunfire (1934) - Townsman (uncredited)
 The Rawhide Terror (1934) - Tom Blake - Betty's Older Brother
 When Lightning Strikes (1934) - Marshall Jack Stevens
 Rustlers of Red Dog (1935 serial) - Ira Dale (Wagonmaster)
 Five Bad Men (1935) - Colonel Matoon
 Defying the Law (1935) - Jim Kenmore
 Naughty Marietta (1935) - Gendarme Chief (uncredited)
 Born to Battle (1935) - John Brownell
 Devil's Canyon (1935)
 The Cowboy and the Bandit (1935) - Sheriff Pete
 Cyclone of the Saddle (1935) - Wagon Master
 The Call of the Savage (1935) - Allen
 The Tia Juana Kid (1935) - Cantina Owner
 The Phantom Cowboy (1935) - Barfly (uncredited)
 The Ghost Rider (1935) - Guard
 Social Error (1935) - Policeman (uncredited)
 The Roaring West (1935) - Jim Parker
 Powdersmoke Range (1935) - Happy - Bartender
 Rough Riding Ranger (1935) - Major Wright
 Courage of the North (1935) - Gene Travis
 Tailspin Tommy in the Great Air Mystery (1935 serial) - Foreman Burke [Chs. 7-9,11-12] (uncredited)
 Nevada (1935) - Wilson
 Frisco Kid (1935) - Vigilante Hangman (uncredited)
 Timber Terrors (1935) - Royce Horter
 Custer's Last Stand (1936 serial) - Wagon Master [Ch. 1] (as Bill Desmond)
 The Broken Coin (1936)
 The Adventures of Frank Merriwell (1936 serial) - Captain of the 'Viking' (uncredited)
 Song of the Saddle (1936) - Stage Driver Tim
 Flash Gordon (1936 serial) - Hawkman Lookout Captain (uncredited)
 The Clutching Hand (1936 serial) - Bartender Steve [Chs.5,8,10-12,14] (uncredited)
 Treachery Rides the Range (1936) - Bill - Stage Driver (uncredited)
 Hollywood Boulevard (1936) - Pago Pago Patron (uncredited)
 The Vigilantes Are Coming (1936) - Anderson
 The Black Coin (1936) - Cantina Bartender
 Cavalry (1936) - Cavalry Major (uncredited)
 Song of the Gringo (1936) - Bailiff
 Headin' for the Rio Grande (1936) - Mr. Mack
 Arizona Days (1937) - Stranger (uncredited)
 The Mysterious Pilot (1937 serial) - Lumberjack / Townsman (uncredited)
 Tim Tyler's Luck (1937 serial) - Dock Official [Ch. 1] (uncredited)
 Man of Conquest (1939) - Tennessee Man (uncredited)
 Winners of the West (1940 serial) - Bill Brine - Foreman
 The Boys from Syracuse (1940) - Citizen (uncredited)
 Junior G-Men (1940 serial) - Irish Cop [Ch. 6] (uncredited)
 A Little Bit of Heaven (1940) - Uncle Francis
 Where Did You Get That Girl? (1941) - Tourist (uncredited)
 Nice Girl? (1941) - Postman (uncredited)
 Bury Me Not on the Lone Prairie (1941) - Bartender
 Sky Raiders (1941 serial) - Murphy - Police Officer [Ch. 9] (uncredited)
 Don Winslow of the Navy (1942 serial) - Pat - Smelter Foreman [Ch. 5] (uncredited)
 Stagecoach Buckaroo (1942) - Barfly (uncredited)
 Raiders of the West (1942) - Townsman (uncredited)
 Gang Busters (1942 serial) - Rogan's Death Witness [Ch. 4] (uncredited)
 Junior G-Men of the Air (1942 serial) - Parts Customer [Ch. 1] (uncredited)
 Down Rio Grande Way (1942) - Townsman (uncredited)
 The Silver Bullet (1942) - Townsman (uncredited)
 Overland Mail (1942 serial) - Williams - Banker [Chs. 5, 12] (uncredited)
 Sin Town (1942) - Town Leader (uncredited)
 Prairie Chickens (1943) - Cache Lake Townsman (uncredited)
 Cheyenne Roundup (1943) - Pete (uncredited)
 Frontier Fury (1943) - Townsman (uncredited)
 The Lone Star Trail (1943) - Bartender Mike (uncredited)
 Frontier Badmen (1943) - Townsman (uncredited)
 Phantom of the Opera (1943) - Stagehand (uncredited)
 Thank Your Lucky Stars (1943) - Westerner in Dennis Morgan Number (uncredited)
 Marshal of Gunsmoke (1944) - Barfly (uncredited)
 Oklahoma Raiders (1944) - Townsman Grinning at Banjo's Fall (uncredited)
 The Scarlet Claw (1944) - Member of Royal Canadian Occult Society (uncredited)
 The Yellow Rose of Texas (1944) - Townsman (uncredited)
 The Mummy's Ghost (1944) - Museum Tourist (uncredited)
 National Barn Dance (1944) - Farmer at Barn Dance (uncredited)
 Tall in the Saddle (1944) - Town Citizen (uncredited)
 The Climax (1944) - Backstage Technician (uncredited)
 Bowery to Broadway (1944) - Man at Bar (uncredited)
 The Old Texas Trail (1944) - Townsman (uncredited)
 Firebrands of Arizona (1944) - Townsman (uncredited)
 Hi, Beautiful (1944) - Passenger (uncredited)
 See My Lawyer (1945) - Bystander (uncredited)
 Song of the Sarong (1945) - Councillor (uncredited)
 The Return of the Durango Kid (1945) - Street Ambusher (uncredited)
 Beyond the Pecos (1945) - Bill - Barfly (uncredited)
 The Naughty Nineties (1945) - (uncredited)
 That Night with You (1945) - Man in Market (uncredited)
 Strange Confession (1945) - Peanut Vendor (uncredited)
 The Royal Mounted Rides Again (1945) - Miner at Meeting (uncredited)
 Frontier Gal (1945) - Barfly (uncredited)
 The Scarlet Horseman (1946 serial) - Barfly (uncredited)
 Code of the West (1947) - Settler (uncredited)
 The Michigan Kid (1947) - Townsman (uncredited)
 The Egg and I (1947) - Spectator at County Fair (uncredited)
 Relentless (1948) - Townsman on Porch (uncredited)
 Are You with It? (1948) - Spectator (uncredited)

References

External links

 
 William Desmond at Virtual History

1878 births
1949 deaths
American male stage actors
American male film actors
American male silent film actors
Male actors from Dublin (city)
Male actors from New York City
Irish emigrants to the United States (before 1923)
Burials at Chapel of the Pines Crematory
20th-century American male actors
Male Western (genre) film actors